The Old Armory on 1st Ave., E., in Williston, North Dakota, was built in 1915. For its historical and architectural significance, it was listed on the National Register of Historic Places in 1985.

According to its NRHP nomination, the building's significance rests on two factors:
The Old Armory brought together diverse sectors of the public in its creation and
subsequent use: local government, military, private business, and the general
townspeople. In architectural character it is uncommon, yet representative of a once popular
type of design for armory buildings in the state.

Although designed by Robert Stacy-Judd, a distinguished architect, his prominence is not noted in the NRHP nomination. In 2012, the local community planned various historically sensitive renovations and fundraising to support the work.

References

Military facilities on the National Register of Historic Places in North Dakota
Infrastructure completed in 1915
National Register of Historic Places in Williams County, North Dakota
Williston, North Dakota
Armories in the United States
1915 establishments in North Dakota